Franklinton Elementary School may refer to:
Franklinton Elementary School (Louisiana)
Franklinton Elementary School (North Carolina)